The 2013–14 Florida Panthers season was the 21st season for the National Hockey League (NHL) franchise that was established on June 14, 1993.

Pre-season
The Panthers were sold on September 27, 2013, to the chairman and CEO of Virtu Financial, Vincent Viola.

Standings

Schedule and results

Pre-season

Regular season

Playoffs 
The Panthers missed the playoffs for the second consecutive year.

Player stats 
Final stats
Skaters

Goaltenders

†Denotes player spent time with another team before joining the Panthers. Stats reflect time with the Panthers only.
‡Denotes player was traded mid-season. Stats reflect time with the Panthers only.
Bold/italics denotes franchise record.

Transactions 

The Panthers have been involved in the following transactions during the 2013–14 season.

Trades

Free agents acquired

Free agents lost

Claimed via waivers

Lost via waivers

Lost via retirement

Player signings

Draft picks

Florida Panthers' picks at the 2013 NHL Entry Draft, which was held in Newark, New Jersey on June 30, 2013.

Draft notes

 The Florida Panthers' third-round pick went to the New York Rangers as the result of a February 25, 2012, trade that sent Wojtek Wolski to the Panthers in exchange for Michael Vernace and this pick.
 The Calgary Flames' fourth-round pick went to the Florida Panthers as the result of a trade on June 18, 2013, that sent Corban Knight to Calgary in exchange for this pick.
 The Edmonton Oilers' fourth-round pick went to the Florida Panthers as a result of an April 3, 2013, trade that sent Jerred Smithson to the Oilers in exchange for this pick.
 The Florida Panthers' seventh-round pick went to the Dallas Stars as the result of a June 23, 2012, trade that sent a 2012 seventh-round pick (#194–Jonatan Nielsen) to the Panthers in exchange for this pick.
 The Montreal Canadiens' seventh-round pick went to the Florida Panthers as a result of a June 30, 2013, trade that sent a 2014 seventh-round pick to the Canadiens in exchange for this pick.

References

Florida Panthers seasons
Florida Panthers season, 2013-14
Flo
Florida Panthers
Florida Panthers